"The Sun Goes Down (Living It Up)" is a single released in 1983 by the musical group Level 42. It is one of the few songs by the group which featured Mike Lindup on lead vocals (although Mark King did contribute as lead vocalist on this track). After the success of "The Chinese Way", and of the album The Pursuit of Accidents, this song featured on the newly released Standing in the Light album. The first single from the album, "Out Of Sight, Out Of Mind", did not obtain the expected success for the recording and for the members of the band, leaving the whole expectation for the second single, The Sun Goes Down.

The song was outstanding in the career of the band, and it became a classic. Reaching No. 10 in the UK charts in the summer of 1983, it became their first single to reach the top ten. It was included later in the collection Level Best, and features on other compilation albums released by the band.

Production
The A side was produced by Larry Dunn, and Verdine White.

Tracks
Original Release:
UK (Polydor; POSP 622) Picture sleeve
Side A: 3:44 "The Sun Goes Down (Living It Up)"
Side B: 4:16 "Can't Walk You Home"

Personnel
Level 42
Mike Lindup - keyboards, lead vocals
Mark King - bass, co-lead vocals, backing vocals
Boon Gould - guitars
Phil Gould - drums, backing vocals
Plus
Wally Badarou - keyboards

References

1983 singles
Level 42 songs
Songs written by Mark King (musician)
Songs written by Mike Lindup
Songs written by Phil Gould (musician)
Songs written by Wally Badarou
Fontana Records singles
Polydor Records singles
1983 songs
Song recordings produced by Verdine White